Darjazin Rural District is a rural district (dehestan) in the Central District of Mehdishahr County, Semnan Province, Iran. At the 2006 census, its population was 170, in 48 families.  The rural district has 2 villages.

References 

Rural Districts of Semnan Province
Mehdishahr County